Utricularia punctata is a medium-sized suspended aquatic carnivorous plant that belongs to the genus Utricularia. U. punctata is native to Borneo, Burma, China, Peninsular Malaysia, Sumatra, Thailand, and Vietnam.

See also 
 List of Utricularia species

References 

Carnivorous plants of Asia
punctata
Flora of Borneo
Flora of Myanmar
Flora of China
Flora of Sumatra
Flora of Peninsular Malaysia
Flora of Thailand
Flora of Vietnam